= House of Pride (Faerie Queene) =

Setting in the poem The Faerie Queene

- The Faerie Queene location
- First appearance: The Faerie Queene, Book I, Canto IV (1590)
- Created by: Edmund Spenser

In-universe information
- Type: Palace
- Ruled by: Lucifera

The House of Pride is a notable setting in Edmund Spenser's epic poem The Faerie Queene (1590, 1596). The actions of cantos IV and V in Book I take place there, and readers have associated the structure with several allegories pertinent to the poem.

== Summary of Canto IV ==
The House of Pride arrives in the text due to the Redcrosse Knight's struggles with materiality and his code of chivalry.

The House is an emblem of sin and worldliness. The ruler of the palace is Lucifera, who is accompanied by her six counselors. Together they represent the seven deadly sins. When the Redcrosse Knight encounters the palace, he is met with Lucifera and her parade. Each counselor, a sin, and the falsehood of the structure itself representing a flawed nature, altogether embody the House of Pride.

The encounter, meant to expose the Redcrosse Knight to the faults of pride, more or less fails. He comes face-to-face with the short-lived pleasure of pridefulness, especially in meeting Lucifera, who is, allegorically, the antithesis to the good-natured Faerie Queene (Queen Elizabeth). Despite experiencing the fabrication of both place and person, Redcrosse continues to indulge in pride. In Canto V, he battles Sansjoy in an effort to reclaim the shield of Sansfoy. This "vanity-driven fight" shows that he continues to value prize over modesty, despite his encounter with the House of Pride.

== The Seven Vices ==
In the House of Pride, the Redcrosse Knight sees Lucifera on a chariot being pulled by six counselors riding animals. With Lucifera symbolizing the sin of pride, the remaining six sins are represented by her counselors. Each counselor slightly resembles the animal he is riding.

- Pride – Lucifera, whose name derives from Lucifer, is ruler of the six counselors in The Faerie Queene. She represents pride because she takes pride in her name, which can be seen as paying homage to Satan.
- Idleness (Sloth) – Described in the poem as "sluggish", Idleness rides a slow donkey, wears a monk's hood or priestly vest, and carries a book of prayer. However, the characteristics associating Idleness with a monk are not traditional of this vice.
- Gluttony – Gluttony is described by Spenser as a "deformed creature" and "more like a monster, than a man". He enters the parade riding a dirty pig, bearing a large stomach and a thin neck. In the poem, Gluttony eats excessively as others starve; this is when gluttony is considered a sin.
- Lechery – The sin of lust. Mounted on a goat, Lechery does not appear to be attractive. He is described as an "unseemely man to please faire Ladies eye; / Yet he of Ladies oft was loved deare, / When fairer faces were bid standen by".
- Avarice – Representing the sin of greed, Avarice enters upon a camel covered with gold as he counts a pile of coins. Spenser describes Avarice's money obsession to be a disease; "Who had enough, yett wished every more, a vile disease, and eke in foote and hand."
- Envy – Envy rides a wolf. When he sees good things happening to those around him death is the consequence; "At neibors welth, that made him ever sad; / For death it was, when any good he saw." When harm reaches people he is delighted; "But when he heard of harme, he wexed wonderous glad."
- Wrath – He carries a branding iron and a dagger as he rides a lion. His clothes are ripped and contain blood stains. He acts quickly in fits of rage, but often repents; "Ne car'd for blood in his avengement: / But when the furious fitt was overpast, / His cruel facts he often would repent."

== Physical construction ==
Canto IV

Upon the reader's first introduction to the House of Pride, Spenser describes:

A stately Pallace built of squared bricke,
Which cunningly was without morter laid,
Whose wals were high, but nothing strong, nor thick,
And golden foile all over them displaid...

—

The House works twofold: on one hand, it represents humanity's attempt at recreating the divine in its own image, which further alludes to the Biblical tale this passage mirrors, the Tower of Babel. In this story, found in Genesis, the people of Babel say, "Come, let us build ourselves a city, with a tower that reaches to the heavens, so that we may make a name for ourselves." (Genesis 11:14) Seen in this light, both structures come to represent the inherent vanity that lies within the human artifice, which futilely attempts to imitate, if not surpass, the one true Christian God.

Simultaneously, the House of Pride works as a symbol for the current state of Redcrosse's mental disposition, as well as the status of his soul. Indeed, Redcrosse's departure from God has been witnessed through his multiple failed encounters with deceit prior to this canto, and his inability to distinguish between truth and deceit ultimately lead him to the doors of his own reflection: the House of Pride.

Thusly we come to see this passage take on a much more impactful meaning: "But full of great pittie, that so faire a mould / Did on so weake a foundation ever sit..." As aptly stated by Blythe, "[A]t this point, Redcross too is only a 'fair mould' on 'weak foundations' who is externally fair to the eye of the world, but inwardly he is becoming increasingly foul..." Overall, the audience comes to see Redcrosse and his embrace of Pride as a welcoming to un-Christian values, which subsequently cause him to stray from the righteous path, and ultimately result in his estrangement from God.

== Sources ==
- Blythe, Joan Heiges (1972). "Spenser and the Seven Deadly Sins: Book I, Cantos IV and V". ELH. 39 (3): 342–352. doi:10.2307/2872188. JSTOR 2872188.
- Lethbridge, J. B. (2013). Shakespeare and Spenser: Attractive opposites. Manchester University Press. ISBN 978-1-84779-743-8.
- Nohrnberg, James, ed. (1976). The Analogy of The Faerie Queene. Princeton University Press. ISBN 978-0-691-06307-2.
- Spenser, Edmund (2006). Kaske, Carol (ed.). The Faerie Queene. Hackett. ISBN 978-1-60384-039-2.
- Spenser, Edmund (1978). Roche, Thomas P. (ed.). The Faerie Queene. Penguin. ISBN 978-0-14-042207-8.
